The Astra 300 was a Spanish semi-automatic pistol manufactured by Astra Unceta from 1922 to 1947.

Description 
The Astra 300 is a Spanish semi-automatic pistol that can be loaded with 6 or 7 cartridges in a stick magazine, depending on the caliber size (7.65mm or 9mm). The length is 160 mm (6.3 in) overall, of which the barrel occupies 98 mm (3.9 in). The Astra 300 was originally designed as a smaller version of the Astra 400.

History 
The Astra 300 was developed in 1922 by the Astra Unceta company and was first produced in Spain in 1922/1923.

This weapon was originally used by the Spanish prison administration in the 1920s, in 1928 the pistol was then used for the first time by the Spanish Navy. In the 1930s, the Astra 300 was primarily an army pistol.

During World War II, it was mainly supplied to the German Wehrmacht, which was stationed in France. Between October 1941 and July 1944, a total of about 85,000 copies of the Astra 300 were delivered from neutral Spain to Berlin in Nazi Germany.

In the production period from 1922 to 1947, a total of 171,300 Astra 300 pistols were manufactured.

In 1948, the Astra 300 was largely replaced by its successor, the Astra 3000. Production of the Astra 300 continued on a small scale until 1967.

References 

Semi-automatic pistols of Spain
Pistols
Semi-automatic pistols